
Gmina Aleksandrów is a rural gmina (administrative district) in Piotrków County, Łódź Voivodeship, in central Poland.

Neighbouring gminas
Gmina Aleksandrów is bordered by the gminas of Mniszków, Paradyż, Przedbórz, Ręczno, Sulejów and Żarnów.

Villages
The gmina contains the following villages having the status of sołectwo: Aleksandrów, Borowiec, Brzezie, Ciechomin, Dąbrowa nad Czarną, Dąbrówka, Dębowa Góra, Dębowa Góra-Kolonia, Jaksonek, Janikowice, Justynów, Kalinków, Kamocka Wola, Kawęczyn, Kotuszów, Marianów, Niewierszyn, Nowy Reczków, Ostrów, Rożenek, Sieczka, Siucice, Siucice-Kolonia, Skotniki, Stara, Stara Kolonia, Szarbsko, Taraska, Wacławów, Włodzimierzów, Wolica and Wólka Skotnicka.

References
Polish official population figures 2006

Aleksandrow
Piotrków County